The March Madness pools are a form of sports betting based on the annual NCAA Division I men's basketball tournament each spring in the United States. March Madness pools or brackets foster the popularity of this phenomenon. The tournament bracket can be completed online or printed out and completed by hand whereby the participant predicts the outcome of each game in the tournament. The bracket is to be completed before the tip of the first four games begins. His or her predictions are compared against others in the pool, and whoever has the best prognostication skills wins the contest. Various other bracket games exist including a board game whereby players draft teams.

Background

Tournament bids

The tournament field comprises 68 teams who play NCAA Divison I college basketball. Among the field, 32 automatic bids are given to winners of each conference, usually via a season-ending conference tournament. The other 36 teams receive at-large bids from a selection committee. The process of selecting at-large bids involves subjective judgment of teams' performance over the course of the season, and can be controversial.

Seeds
The four lowest ranked automatic bid teams and the four lowest ranked at-large teams in the tournament play in special play-in games called the First Four at the start of the tournament. The rest of the field is split into four regions of 16 teams, and those regions are seeded from 1 to 16. The top team in each region plays the 16th team, the second plays the 15th and so on. The field plays a 6-round single-elimination tournament, in which a single loss ends a team's chances of becoming champions.

Timeframe
The tournament takes place over three weekends starting with "Selection Sunday" in mid-March and concluding with the semifinals and championship game (Final Four), usually held on the first weekend of April.

Brackets
Perhaps the biggest key to the tremendous popularity of the tournament is the bracket. The March Madness bracket is the visual representation of all the teams in the tournament and the path they have to follow to the Final Four and the championship game. Some March Madness contests are free to enter, others require an entry fee.  Many businesses utilize pool hosting services to run their pools, allowing them the flexibility to customize the pool rules and display.  The board game has its own set of rules for drafting teams and computing scores. Scoring systems usually award increasingly more points for correctly picking winners in later rounds.

Pursuit of the perfect bracket 
Filling out a bracket with the winners of each of the 63 games is an incredibly difficult task, and nobody has successfully filled out a perfect bracket. Warren Buffet publicly offered $1 billion for a successful perfect bracket, popularizing the concept. Various approaches have been taken to estimate the chance of predicting a perfect bracket. If games were 50/50 propositions, the chances of a bracket being perfect are 1 in 2^63, or 1 in 9,223,372,036,854,775,808 (9.2 quintillion).
Other estimates of the chance of a perfect bracket, accounting for usual patterns of tournament results, have ranged from 1 in 576 quadrillion to 1 in 128 billion. The longest a bracket has stayed perfect is 49 games in 2019 - encompassing the entire Round of 64 and Round of 32 - before the first incorrectly predicted result occurred in the Sweet 16 round. Of note, the 2019 tournament was marked by relatively few upsets.

Popularity
March Madness has become one of the most popular sporting events in the United States. Because of the length of the tournament and the number of teams involved it is one of the most popular sporting events in terms of television ratings. One event associated with March Madness is filling out the brackets. It has become extremely common in popular culture, even among non-sports fans; it is estimated that tens of millions of Americans participate in the contest every year. Mainstream media outlets such as ESPN, CBS Sports, Fox Sports or MGM host tournaments online where contestants can enter for free and obtain high valuable cash prizes up to 2 million dollars. Employers have also noticed a change in the behavior of employees during this time: they have seen an increase in the number of sick days used, extended lunch breaks and even the rescheduling of conference calls to allow for more tournament watching. There are also many handicappers and pundits which offer advice for winning one's bracket.

See also
Betting pool

References

Further reading
 
 
 

NCAA Division I men's basketball tournament
Sports betting